Hakkı Çapkınoğlu (born 20 July 1990) is a Turkish volleyball player for Galatasaray and the Turkish national team.

Club career
On 26 April 2021, Galatasaray HDI Sigorta Men's Volleyball Team signed a 2-year contract with experienced Middle blocker Çapkınoğlu.

National team career
He participated at the 2017 Men's European Volleyball Championship.

References

External links
Player profile at Volleybox.net

1990 births
Living people
Turkish men's volleyball players
Arkas Spor volleyball players
People from Hopa
Galatasaray S.K. (men's volleyball) players
Halkbank volleyball players